Cleopatra has frequently been the subject of literature, films, plays, television programs, and art. Only those with Wikipedia articles are cited.

Advertising
 Kimberly-Clark: 2010 TV campaign for Poise adult underwear with Whoopi Goldberg as Cleopatra 
 Doctor's Associates: Subway 2010 "Five Dollar Foot Long" TV campaign with Ewa Da Cruz as Cleopatra
 Fleet Laboratories: 2011 Summer's Eve TV campaign 
 ooVoo: "Arcana Academy" campaign

Art

 Arnaud Courlet de Vregille: Le Grand Voyage (2011)
Robert K. Abbett: cover of Cleopatra (1962)
Lawrence Alma-Tadema: Cleopatra (1875)
 The Meeting of Antony and Cleopatra (1883) 
Ivan Argunov: Умирающая Клеопатра (1749) 
Francesco Xanto Avelli: Marco Antonio e Cleopatra (1542) 
Gillian Ayres: Antony and Cleopatra (1982)
Bartolommeo Bandinelli: Cleopatra
Francesco Baratta: Cleopatra 
François Barois: Cléopâtre mourant (1700)
Pompeo Batoni: Cleopatra e Marco Antonio morente (1763)
Hans Sebald Beham: Der tod der Kleopatra (1529) 
Gyula Benczúr: Kleopátra (1911)
Claude Bertin: Cléopâtre se suicide (c. 1697)
Jacques Blanchard: La mort de Cléopâtra (c. 1620)
Arnold Böcklin Kleopatra (1872)
Pier Jacopo Alari Bonacolsi Cleopatra (1519–1522)
Boucicaut Master: Cléopâtre est présentée avec la tête et membres de son propre enfant (c. 1415) 
 Le tombeau de Marc Antony et de Cléopâtre (c. 1415) 
Frederick Arthur Bridgman: Cleopatra on the Terraces of Philae (1896)
 Cleopatra's Barge
Frank Brunner: Cleopatra (1976)
Winifred Brunton: Queen Cleopatra VII
Alexandre Cabanel: Cléopatre essayant des poisons sur des condangés à mort (1887)
Guido Cagnacci: La morte di Cleopatra (1658)
 La morte di Cleopatra (1660)
Denis Calvaert: De dood van Cleopatra (1590)
Andrea Casali: Antonio e Cleopatra 
André Castaigne: Antoine et Cléopâtre (1911)
Chelsea Porcelain: The Death of Cleopatra (1760) 
Demetre Chiparus: Cleopatra (c. 1925)
Giovanni Battista Cipriani: Cleopatra after Benvenuto Cellini
Auguste Clésinger: Cléopâtre 
Henry Clive, Cleopatra (1929) (1946)
John Collier: The Death of Cleopatra (1890)
Michel Corneille Cléopâtre et l'aspic (1650–1660)
Donato Creti: Cleopatra (1710)
Pietro da Cortona: Caesar Placing Cleopatra Back on the Throne of Egypt ("Cesare rimette Cleopatra sul trono d'Egitto") (1637)
Salvador Dalí: Cesare y Cleopatra (1972)
 La muerte de Cleopatra (1975)
 Les Amoureux Antoine et Cléopâtre (1979)
Leonardo da Pistoia: Cleopatra 
George and Edward Dalziel: Cleopatra (1864) after Frederick Sandys
Jacopo de' Barbari: Cleopatra (c. 1508) 
Jan de Bray: Het banket van Marcus Antonius en Cleopatra (1669)
Eugène Delacroix: Cléopâtre et le paysan (1838)
Gerard de Lairesse: La banquet de Cléopâtre (1680)
Jean François de Troy: La mort de Cléopâtre 
Archie Dickens: Cleopatra (1990)
Erté: cover for the February 1927 Harper's Bazaar 
Thomas Francis Dicksee: Cleopatra (1876)
Piero di Cosimo: Cleopatra (1485–1490)
Domenichino: La morte di Cleopatra
Jean-Bernard Duvivier: Cléopâtre (1789)
Edward Mason Eggleston: Cleopatra (1934)

Adrian Feint: Anthony and Cleopatra
Harrison Fisher: Cleopatra (1907) 
Lavinia Fontana: Cleopatra (1585)
Elisabeth Frink: Anthony and Cleopatra (1982), modeled by Helen Mirren and Michael Gambon
Felice Ficherelli: La morte di Cleopatra (1650)
 Scene dalla vita di Cleopatra silver basin (1620–1625) after Bernardo Strozzi
Margaret Foley: Cleopatra
Giacomo Francia: Cleopatra
Francesco Furini: La morte di Cleopatra 
Louis Gauffier: Cléopâtre et Octavian (1788)
Cesare Gennari: Cleopatra (1663)
Artemisia Gentileschi: Cleopatra (1621–1622)
 Cleopatra (1630)
Orazio Gentileschi: Cleopatra
Jean-Léon Gérôme: Cléopâtre et César (1866)
Giampietrino: Cleopatra (c. 1525)
 La morte di Cleopatra (c. 1530)
Achille Glisenti: La morte di Cleopatra (1878)
Luca Giordano: Cleopatra (c. 1700)
Pierre Gobert: La Duchesse du Maine en Cléopâtre 
Thomas Ridgeway Gould: Cleopatra (1873) 
Guercino: Il suicidio di Cleopatra (1621)
 La Cleopatra morente (c. 1648)
Gavin Hamilton: The Death of Cleopatra (1767)
Augustin Hirschvogel: Der tod der Kleopatra
Gerard Hoet: Het Feest van Cleopatra 
Howard David Johnson: Cleopatra, Queen of Egypt 
Jacob Jordaens: Het Feest van Cleopatra (1653)
Louis-Jean-François Lagrenée: La mort de Cléopâtre
Giovanni Lanfranco: Il suicidio di Cleopatra (1632–1633)
Gregorio Lazzarini: Cleopatra o allegoria della Prudenza
Edmonia Lewis: The Death of Cleopatra (1876)
Johann Liss: Der tod der Kleopatra (1622–1624)
Claude Lorrain: Le débarquement de Cléopâtre à Tarse (1642–1643)
Juan Luna: La muerte de Cleopatra (1881)
Angelica Kauffman: Cleopatra
Hans Makart: Der tod der Kleopatra (1875)
 Die Niljagd der Kleopatra (1883–1884)
Carlo Maratta: Cleopatra e la perla (1650)
Jan Matsys: Cleopatra (c. 1565) 
Luigi Mayer Baths of Cleopatra at Alexandria (1802), commissioned by Sir Robert Ainslie, 1st Baronet
Giuseppe Mazzuoli: La morte di Cleopatra (c. 1713) 
Sebastiano Mazzoni: La morte di Cleopatra
 Il Banchetto di Cleopatra (1660) 
Angus McBride: Antony and Cleopatra (1973)
Anton Raphael Mengs: Augustus und Kleopatra (1761)
Michelangelo: Cleopatra (1533–1534)
Pierre Mignard: La mort de Cléopâtre (1670)
Gustave Moreau: Cléopâtre (c. 1887)
Caspar Netscher: De dood van Cleopatra (1673)
Terese Nielsen: Cleopatra
Theodor Pallady: Cleopatra 
Michael Parkes: Cleopatra (1990)
Maxfield Parrish: Cleopatra (1917)
Gianfrancesco Penni: La morte di Cleopatra
Johann Georg Platzer: Antonius und Kleopatra in der Schlacht bei Actium (c. 1750)
 Das Gastmal der Kleopatra (1750) 
Valentine Cameron Prinsep: The Death of Cleopatra 
Domenico Puligo: La morte di Cleopatra (c. 1525)
Marcantonio Raimondi: La morte di Cleopatra (1520–1525) 
Jean-Baptiste Regnault: La mort de Cléopâtre (1796–1799)
Rembrandt: Studie van een naakt vrouw als Cleopatra (c. 1637)
Guido Reni: Cleopatra con l'aspide (1630)
 Cleopatra (1635–1640)
Pietro Ricchi: La morte di Cleopatra (c. 1670)
Sebastiano Ricci: La morte di Cleopatra
Domenico Riccio: Il suicidio di Cleopatra (1552)
Antoine Rivalz: La mort de Cléopâtre 
Jean-André Rixens: La mort de Cléopâtre (1874)
Girolamo Romani: La morte di Cleopatra lunette (1531–1532) 
Mimmo Rotella: Cleopatra
Peter Paul Rubens: Cleopatra (1615)
School of Fontainebleau: Cléopâtre 
 Cléopâtre (1754) 
Eliza Sharpe: Cleopatra 
Elisabetta Sirani: Cleopatra 
Andrea Solari: Cleopatra 
Leonello Spada: La morte di Cleopatra 
Pierre Gustave Eugene Staal: Cleopatra (1858), from Mary Cowden Clarke's World Noted Women
Massimo Stanzione: Cleopatra (1630) 
William Wetmore Story: Cleopatra (1869)
Jean-Joseph Taillasson: Cléopâtre découvert par Rodogune d'avoir empoisonné la coupe nuptial (1791)
Giovanni Battista Tiepolo painted several works and cycles on Anthony and Cleopatra. The Banquet of Cleopatra (1744) is in Melbourne, Australia. Tiepolo returned to the subject a few years later in a scene in his fresco cycle on Anthony and Cleopatra in the Palazzo Labia in Venice.  A further large oil Tiepolo version is paired with a Meeting of Cleopatra and Mark Anthony.  This is in Arkhangelskoye Palace near Moscow (1747, 338 x 600 cm). There are several oil sketch modelli and drawings. 
Timotheus: Queen Cleopatra 
Michele Tosini: Cleopatra 
Francesco Trevisani: Il banchetto di Marco Antonio (1702)
Henry Tresham: In the Palace in Alexandria (1795), published by the Boydell Shakespeare Gallery dramatizing Antony and Cleopatra 
Alessandro Turchi: La morte di Antonio e Cleopatra (1630–1635)
 La morte di Cleopatra (1640)
Anthony van Dyck: Death of Cleopatra VII
Justus van Egmont: Het verhaal van Marcus Antonius en Cleopatra (1677) 
 Het verhaal van Caesar en Cleopatra (1680) tapestry
Willem van Mieris: De dood van Cleopatra (1694)
Jan van Scorel: De stervende Cleopatra (c. 1523) 
Alessandro Varotari: Cleopatra 
Vecchietta: Antonio e Cleopatra
Claude Vignon: Cléopâtre se donnant la mort (c. 1640)
Vincent of Beauvais: "Les suicides d'Antoine et Cléopâtre" from Le Miroir Historial 
John William Waterhouse: Cleopatra (1888)
Richard Caton Woodville: Cleopatra
 The Death of Cleopatra (1889) for The Illustrated London News

Astronomy
 Johann Palisa named 216 Kleopatra after Cleopatra

Ballet

 Jean-Pierre Aumer and Rodolphe Kreutzer: Antony et Cléopâtre (1808)
 Michel Fokine and Anton Arensky: Nuit d'Egypte (1908) 
 restaged as Cléopâtre (1909) by Sergei Diaghilev, starring Ida Rubinstein, costumed by Léon Bakst
 Martha Graham and Halim El-Dabh: One More Gaudy Night (1961)
 David Nixon and Claude-Michel Schönberg: Cleopatra (2011) for the Northern Ballet
 Jean-Georges Noverre: Antony et Cléopâtre (1765)
 Ben Stevenson: Cleopatra (2000) for the Houston Ballet

Beauty and fashion
 Colgate-Palmolive: Cleopatra line of beauty cream, soap and lotions

Celebrities
 Marilyn Monroe posed as Theda Bara as Cleopatra for the December 22, 1958 Life, shot by Richard Avedon
 Sandra Bernhard posed as Cleopatra for the August 1989 cover of Spy
 Kim Kardashian posed as Cleopatra based on Elizabeth Taylor's portrayal for the March 2011 Harper's Bazaar

Comics
 Robert Bernstein: Tales of Suspense #44, Tony Stark follows The Mad Pharaoh to ancient Egypt, and aids Cleopatra 
 Bret Blevins and Rick Remender: Legion of the Supernatural, #3
 Walter Crane: Sheba
 René Goscinny and Albert Uderzo: Cleopatra is a recurring character in the Asterix comic series, first appearing in Asterix and Cleopatra
 Don Marquis: Archy and Mehitabel
 Vicente Segrelles: Cleopatra
 Mike Maihack: Cleopatra in Space (2014)

Documentaries
Ancients Behaving Badly: Cleopatra (2009) 
Cleopatra, Portrait of a Killer (2009) (Camelia Ben Sakour)
Rome's Greatest Battles: Actium (2010) (Laëtitia Eïdo)

Educational cultural depictions

 Journey Down The Nile: a film, lecture, and cultural dance program, by Layla Taj

Film

 Cléopâtre (1899) (Jeanne d'Alcy)
 Antony and Cleopatra (1908) (Florence Lawrence)
 Cleopatra, Queen of Egypt (1912) (Helen Gardner)
 Cleopatra (1917) (Theda Bara)
 Antony and Cleopatra (1924) (Ethel Teare)
 Cleopatra (1934) (Claudette Colbert)
 Dante's Inferno (1935) (Lorna Low)
 Cleopatra (1943) (Amina Rizk)
 Caesar and Cleopatra (1945) (Vivien Leigh)
 The Bishop's Wife (1947): Dudley states that Wutheridge's coin was struck by Julius Caesar to pay for Cleopatra's visit to Rome 
 Serpent of the Nile (1953) (Rhonda Fleming)
 Due notti con Cleopatra (1954) (Sophia Loren)
 The Story of Mankind (1957) (Virginia Mayo)
 A Queen for Caesar (1962) (Pascale Petit)
 Cleopatra (1963) (Elizabeth Taylor)
 Totò e Cleopatra (1963) (Magali Noël)
 Take Her, She's Mine (1963): Mollie and several other women at a costume party are dressed as Cleopatra
 Carry On Cleo (1964) (Amanda Barrie)
 Asterix and Cleopatra (1968) (Micheline Dax)
 Cleopatra (1970) (Chinatsu Nakayama)
 Cleopatra (1970) (Viva)
 Antony and Cleopatra (1972) (Hildegarde Neil)
 Highway to Hell (1992) (Amy Stiller)
 Cleopatra (1999) (Leonor Varela)
 Asterix & Obelix: Mission Cleopatra (2002) (Monica Bellucci)
 Scooby-Doo! in Where's My Mummy? (2005) (Virginia Madsen)
 Giulio Cesare (2006) (Danielle de Niese)

Games
 Age of Empires: The Rise of Rome: The campaign in "Pax Romana: 1. Actium" has a history section that talks about Antony and Cleopatra falling in love, the navy battle in Egypt, and their downfall by suicide. The player must sink Cleopatra's barge in order to win the campaign.
 Anachronism Set 2 includes Cleopatra.
 Assassin's Creed II: In the backstory of the game, Cleopatra is included in a list of tyrannical rulers targeted by the assassins. She is killed by a female assassin named Amunet, who assassinates her using an asp to make the queen's death appear to be a suicide.
 Assassin's Creed Origins: Cleopatra plays a more active role in the story of this later entry to the franchise, first as an ally to the Hidden Ones, a predecessor to the Assassin Brotherhood, and later as an enemy along with Julius Caesar. Her killer Amunet, once known as Aya of Alexandria, also plays a major role as a leader of the Hidden Ones and ex-wife of the protagonist, Bayek of Siwa.
 BreakAway's and Impressions's Cleopatra: Queen of the Nile (2000)
 Double Dragon 3: The Rosetta Stone – Cleopatra appears as an end boss in the final level of the arcade game.
 Cleopatra and the Society of Architects
 Cleopatra Fortune
 Civilization II
 Civilization III
 Civilization VI
 Civilization Revolution
 Cleopatra is a playable character in the Mobile/PC Game Rise of Kingdoms.
 Dante's Inferno
 Fate/Grand Order: Cleopatra is an Assassin class servant. She is the antagonist of a Halloween event, where she wishes to reunite with Caesar and is dismayed to find that he has grown fat.
 Kheops Studio's Cleopatra: A Queen's Destiny (2007)
 Night at the Museum: Battle of the Smithsonian
 Scribblenauts and its sequels
 Shadow of Rome: Iris and Charmian, twins who appear throughout the game who employ the character Sextus and his gladiators, are implied to be working for Cleopatra, even though it is never confirmed.
 Total War: Rome II
 International Game Technology has a series of Cleopatra slot machines.

Literature
 Jacob Abbott: Cleopatra (1879)
 Giovanni Boccaccio: "Cleopatrae, Aegypti Reginae" (from De mulieribus claris)
 Gillian Bradshaw: Cleopatra's Heir
 Charlotte Brontë: Villette, Lucy is mortified at seeing a semi-nude painting of Cleopatra
 Pat Brown (criminal profiler): The Murder of Cleopatra: History's Greatest Cold Case (2013) 
 Mary Butts: Scenes from the Life of Cleopatra (1935)
 Jeffrey K. Gardner: Cleopatra
 Georg Ebers: Kleopatra (1894)
 Karen Essex: Kleopatra (2001) and Pharaoh (2002)
 Colin Falconer: When We Were Gods (2000)
 Sarah Fielding: The Lives of Cleopatra and Octavia (1758)
 Théophile Gautier: "Un Nuit de Cléopâtre" (1838)
 Margaret George: The Memoirs of Cleopatra (1997)
 Delphine de Girardin: Cléopâtre (1847)
 Kristiana Gregory: The Royal Diaries: Cleopatra VII: Daughter of the Nile, Egypt, 57 B.C.
 Henry Gréville: Cléopâtre (1886)
 H. Rider Haggard: Cleopatra: Being an Account of the Fall and Vengeance of Harmachis
 E. E. Y. Hales: Chariot of Fire (1977 Fantasy novel) (sent to Hell after her death, Cleopatra plans a revolution against Satan)
 Margaret Carver Leighton: Cleopatra: Sister of the Moon (1969)
 Michael Livingston: The Shards of Heaven (2015)
 Emil Ludwig: Kleopatra: Geschichte einer Königin (1937)
 Colleen McCullough: Caesar: Let the Dice Fly, The October Horse, and Antony and Cleopatra
 Michelle Moran: Cleopatra's Daughter (2009)
 Talbot Mundy: Queen Cleopatra (1929)
 Ray Nelson: "Blake's Progress", an Alternate History - Cleopatra wins at Actium, leading to a future of a Greek-speaking, Isis-worshiping world civilization  
 Plutarch: Life of Antony
 Francine Prose: Cleopatra: Her History, Her Myth (2022)
 François Rabelais: Cléopâtre dans l'Hadès (1553)
 Steven Saylor: The Judgment of Caesar
 Stacy Schiff: Cleopatra: A Life (2010)
 John Maddox Roberts: The Princess and the Pirates
 Thornton Wilder: The Ides of March

Music

 Tal Bachman's "She's So High" references Cleopatra
 Charles Griffes's "Cleopatra to the Asp" (1912)
 Charlie Sexton's "Impressed" references Antony and Cleopatra (from Pictures for Pleasure)
 Danny Schmidt's "Cleopatra" (2005) 
 Spin Doctors's "Cleopatra's Cat" (1994) (from Turn It Upside Down)
 Sophie Tucker's "Cleopatra Had a Jazz Band" (1917) 
 Thompson Twins's "Lies" references Cleopatra
 Adam and the Ants's "Cleopatra" from Dirk Wears White Sox; later covered by Elastica
 Frank Ocean's "Pyramids" (2012) extensively references Cleopatra
 Epic Rap Battles of History's "Cleopatra vs. Marilyn Monroe"
 Katy Perry's video for "Dark Horse" features an Ancient Egyptian theme, with her playing "Katy-Patra"
 Madonna's "Like It or Not" references Cleopatra (from Confessions on a Dance Floor)
 Britney Spears’s Femme Fatale Tour third segment is represented by an Egyptian-theme and the singer, dressed as Cleopatra, performs Gimme More, (Drop Dead) Beautiful, He About to Lose Me, Boys and Don’t Let Me Be the Last to Know
 The Lumineers' Cleopatra. The album cover is of Theda Bara in Cleopatra
 Zico's video for "Eureka" features him being imprisoned by Cleopatra
 Cleopatra's "Cleopatra's Theme", from the album Comin' Atcha (1998).
 The Engineers' Drinking Song has a verse that lampoons the relationship between Cleopatra and Julius Caesar
 "That's What Love Is" from the 1964 film Surf Party references Cleopatra

Opera
 Cleopatra (1779) by Pasquale Anfossi
 Antony and Cleopatra by Samuel Barber
 La Mort de Cléopâtre (1829) (cantata) by Hector Berlioz
 Antoine et Cléopâtre (1972) by Emmanuel Bondeville
 Cleopatra (1904) (tone poem) by George Whitefield Chadwick
 La Cleopatra by Domenico Cimarosa
 Omnium (2005) by Norman Durkee
 Antoine et Cléopâtre (2006) by Lewis Furey (adapted from Shakespeare's Antony and Cleopatra)
 "Variation de Cléopâtre" (from Faust) by Charles Gounod
 Cleopatra e Cesare (1742) by Carl Heinrich Graun
 Great Caesar (1899) (burlesque) by George Grossmith, Jr. and Paul Rubens
 Cleopatra's Night by Henry Kimball Hadley
 Giulio Cesare (1724) by George Frideric Handel
 Antonio e Cleopatra (1725) (serenata) by Johann Adolph Hasse
 Antonio e Cleopatra (1937) by Gian Francesco Malipiero
 Cléopâtre (1914) by Jules Massenet
 Die unglückselige Kleopatra, Königin von Ägypten (1704) by Johann Mattheson
 Antonio e Cleopatra (1701) (serenata) by Alessandro Scarlatti
 Die Perlen der Kleopatra (1923) by Oscar Straus

Plays
 Caesar's Revenge (1595) by Anonymous
 The False One (1620) by Francis Beaumont and Philip Massinger
 Caesar in Egypt (1724) by Colley Cibber (Cleopatra is a major character)
 Cleopatra by Samuel Daniel
 All for Love by John Dryden
 Marc-Antoine (c. 1578) by Robert Garnier
 Harmachio (1890) by H. Rider Haggard (renamed Cleopatra in 1891)
 Cléopâtre Captive (1552–1553) by Étienne Jodelle
 Cleopatra (1661) by Daniel Casper von Lohenstein
 Cléopâtre (1630) by Jean Mairet
 Cleopâtre (1750) by Jean-François Marmontel
 Cleopatra, Queen of Egypt, Her Tragedy (1639) by Thomas May
 Cléopâtre (1890) by Émile Moreau and Victorien Sardou
 Antony and Cleopatra (1677) by Charles Sedley
 Antony and Cleopatra by William Shakespeare
 Caesar and Cleopatra by George Bernard Shaw
 The Death of Cleopatra (1929) by Ahmed Shawqi
 The Tragedy of Antonie (c. 1592) by Mary Sidney

Poetry
 "Dead Cleopatra Lies in a Crystal Casket" (1917) by Conrad Aiken
 "Cerchio II, Canto V" by Dante Alighieri (from Inferno)
 "Клеопатра" by Anna Akhmatova
 "Cléopâtre" (1670) by Isaac de Benserade
 "Cleopatrie Martiris, Egipti Regine" by Geoffrey Chaucer (from The Legend of Good Women)
 "Cleopatra" by Robert Crawford
 "La Cleopatra" (1632) by Girolamo Graziani
 "Antoine et Cléopâtre" (from Les Trophées, 1878–1887) by José-Maria de Heredia
 "Cleopatra to the Asp" (1960) by Ted Hughes
 "Cleopatra" (1836) by Letitia Elizabeth Landon
 "Antony and Cleopatra" (1857) by William Haines Lytle
 "Au jardin de l’infante, Cléopâtre" (1893) by Albert Samain
 "Early in the Morning" (1955) by Louis Simpson
 "After Reading Antony and Cleopatra" (1890) by Robert Louis Stevenson
 "Cleopatra" (1868) by William Wetmore Story
 "Cleopatra" (1864) by Algernon Charles Swinburne
 "Cleopatra to the Asp" (1897) by John B. Tabb

Television
 Antonio e Cleopatra (1965) (Valeria Valeri)
 Antony and Cleopatra (1974) Royal Shakespeare Company (Janet Suzman)
 Antony and Cleopatra (1981) BBC Television Shakespeare (Jane Lapotaire)
 Antony and Cleopatra (1983) (Lynn Redgrave)
 Astro Boy (1980): "The Return of Queen Cleopatra" (Season 1, Episode 31)
 Bewitched: "Samantha's Caesar Salad", Samantha conjures up Cleopatra to try to persuade Julius Caesar to return to his time
 Cleopatra (Leonor Varela)
 Cleopatra (2010) (Sulaf Fawakherji)
 Cleopatra in Space (2019), an animated children's series
 The Cleopatras (Michelle Newell)
 Clone High: (voiced by Christa Miller)
 The Danny Thomas Show: "The Singing Sisters", as Kathy badgers Danny to audition a pair of singing nuns, he tells her "Okay, Cleopatra, get that snake away from me."
 Doctor Who:
 "The Pandorica Opens", River Song poses as Cleopatra several decades after her death 
 "The Husbands of River Song", it is implied that The Doctor was once married to Cleopatra
 Fantasy Island: "My Fair Pharaoh", a woman (Joan Collins) wants to be Cleopatra
 General Electric Theater: "Caesar and Cleopatra" (Piper Laurie)
 Giulio Cesare (1990) (Susan Larson)
 Hallmark Hall of Fame: "Caesar and Cleopatra" (Geneviève Bujold)
 Histeria! (voiced by Tress MacNeille)
 Horrible Histories (Martha Howe-Douglas/Kathryn Drysdale)
 Imperium: Augustus (Anna Valle)
 Julius Caesar (Samuela Sardo)
 Legends of the Hidden Temple: "The Snake Bracelet of Cleopatra"
 Meeting of Minds: "Queen Cleopatra/Theodore Roosevelt/Thomas Aquinas/Thomas Paine" (Jayne Meadows)
 The Morecambe & Wise Show: "Season 5, Episode 5" (Glenda Jackson)
 Rocky and Bullwinkle
 Banana Formula pt. 6 (TBA)
 The Mr. Peabody and Sherman Show (Grey Griffin)
 Mujeres Insólitas: "La Sierpe del Nilo" (Rocío Dúrcal)
 The New Addams Family: "Cleopatra, Green of the Nile" (Adam Behr and Nicholas Podbrey)
 Producers' Showcase: "Caesar and Cleopatra" (Claire Bloom)
 Puella Magi Madoka Magica: Episode 11
 Rome (2005–07) (Lyndsey Marshal)
 The Spread of the Eagle (1963) (TV series) (Mary Morris)
 The Supersizers...: "The Supersizers Eat...Ancient Rome" (Sue Perkins)
 Teen Angel: "Honest Abe and Popular Steve" (Sue Giosa)
 You Are There: "The Death of Cleopatra" (Kim Stanley)
 Xena: Warrior Princess:
 "King of Assassins" (Gina Torres)
 "Antony & Cleopatra" (Jo Davidson/Lucy Lawless)
 Music video Horrible Histories Song - RA RA Cleopatra CBBC (about 2009)

Tobacco
 Cleopatra cigarettes

References

External links